Svevia is an independent public company which builds and operates roads and infrastructure in Sweden. Svevia is the fourth largest civil engineering company in the country, with approximately 1,900 employees and a turnover of SEK 8.1 billion (in 2020). It is the largest road operation and maintenance company in Sweden.

Svevia has its origins in the production division of the former Swedish Road Administration (Vägverket).

The company headquarters is in Stockholm. The chairman is Olof Ehrlén and the president and CEO is Anders Gustafsson.

The name "Svevia" is also the Italian-language exonym for Swabia, a historical region of Germany.

See also 
 Infranord

References

External links 
 

Government-owned companies of Sweden
Civil engineering contractors
Construction and civil engineering companies of Sweden
Roads in Sweden
Infrastructure in Sweden
Companies based in Stockholm